The 56th edition of the Vuelta a Colombia was held from August 5 to August 20, 2006.

Stages

2006-08-05: Táriba — San Cristóbal (19.8 km)

2006-08-06: Circuito San Cristóbal (144 km)

2006-08-07: San Cristóbal — Pamplona (133 km)

2006-08-08: Piedecuesta — San Gil (113.5 km)

2006-08-09: San Gil — Tunja (183.3 km)

2006-08-10: Circuito del Sol y del Acero Sogamoso (159.2 km)

2006-08-12: Madrid — Ibagué (203.6 km)

2006-08-13: Ibagué — Armenia (114.1 km)

2006-08-14: Armenia — Cali (185 km)

2006-08-15: Palmira — Buga (47.8 km)

2006-08-16: Buga — Cartago (139.6 km)

2006-08-17: Santa Rosa de Cabal — Ciudad Bolívar (192.8 km)

2006-08-18: Ciudad Bolívar — Medellín Pueblito Paisa (150.6 km)

2006-08-19: Envigado — Alto del Escobero (10.7 km)

2006-08-20: Circuito Medellín (108 km)

Jersey progression

Final classification

Teams 

Lotería de Boyacá — Coordinadora
 Director Deportivo: José Alfonso "El Pollo" López

EPM — Orbitel
 Director Técnico: Raúl Mesa

Gobernación del Zulia — Alcaldia de Cabimas

Colombia es Pasión — Coldeportes
 Director Deportivo: Jairo Monroy Gutiérrez

Gobernacíon Norte de Santander — Selle Italia

Lotería del Táchira

Atom — Azpiru

Frutidelicias Frugos del Valle
 Director Deportivo: William Palacio

Coordinadora

Indeportes Boyacá — Alcaldia de Paipa

Idermeta

Coldeportes

Orbitel — EPM
 Director Deportivo: Carlos Jaramillo

Postal Express — Liga Bogotá

Canal V.O.S — Cicloases

See also 
 2006 Clásico RCN

References 
 cyclingnews

Vuelta a Colombia
Chile
Vuelta Ciclista